Penfield may refer to:

Places
Penfield, Georgia
Penfield, Illinois
Penfield, New York
Penfield Township, Lorain County, Ohio
Penfield, Pennsylvania
Penfield, South Australia
Penfield Gardens, South Australia

Transportation
Penfield railway line, Adelaide, South Australia
Penfield 1 railway station
Penfield 2 railway station
Penfield 3 railway station
Penfield station (SEPTA), in Haverford Township, Pennsylvania

Other uses
Doctor Penfield Avenue, Montreal
Louis Penfield House, Ohio, built by Frank Lloyd Wright
Penfield Academy, Quebec
Penfield Central School District, New York
Penfield High School, New York
Penfield homunculus, a distorted representation of the human body
Penfield Library, State University of New York at Oswego
Penfield Reef, extending from Fairfield, Connecticut to the Long Island Sound
Penfield Reef Light, Connecticut 
Penfield (surname), including a list of people with the name
Penfield Outdoor Apparel, a Massachusetts clothing company
Prix Wilder-Penfield, an award for biomedicine research

See also
 Pinfield (surname)